The 2014–15 North Dakota State Bison men's basketball team represented North Dakota State University in the 2014–15 NCAA Division I men's basketball season. The Bison, led by first year head coach David Richman, played their home games at the Scheels Arena, due to renovations at the Bison Sports Arena, and were members of The Summit League. They finished the season 23–10, 12–4 in The Summit League play to finish as regular season co–champions of The Summit. They defeated Denver, Oral Roberts, and South Dakota State to become champions of The Summit League tournament. They received an automatic bid to the NCAA tournament where they lost in the second round to Gonzaga.

Roster

Schedule

|-
!colspan=9 style="background:#008000; color:#FFFF00;"| Exhibition

|-
!colspan=9 style="background:#008000; color:#FFFF00;"| Regular season

|-
!colspan=9 style="background:#008000; color:#FFFF00;"| The Summit League tournament

|-
!colspan=9 style="background:#008000; color:#FFFF00;"| NCAA tournament

References

North Dakota State Bison men's basketball seasons
North Dakota State
North Dakota State
Bison
Bison